General Tanaka may refer to:

Hisakazu Tanaka (1889–1947), Imperial Japanese Army lieutenant general
Ryūkichi Tanaka (1896–1972), Imperial Japanese Army major general
Shizuichi Tanaka (1887–1945), Imperial Japanese Army general